Šmarje pri Sežani is a settlement north of Sežana in the Littoral region of Slovenia. It is located in the heart of the Karst Plateau, close to the border with Italy, around 15 km from the city of Trieste.

Name
The name of the settlement was changed from Šmarje to Šmarje pri Sežani in 1955.

Church
The local church, from which the settlement gets its name, is dedicated to the Assumption of Mary and belongs to the Parish of Sežana.

Trivia
The village features in the Dutch advertisement for a pension fund run by the insurance company Swiss Life.

References

External links
Šmarje pri Sežani on Geopedia

Populated places in the Municipality of Sežana